Duff's may refer to:

 Duff's Brooklyn, Williamsburg, Brooklyn, NY, USA
 Duff's device, computer science implementation by Tom Duff
 Duff's Famous Wings, restaurant in Buffalo, New York

See also
 Duff (disambiguation)
 Duffs, golf